Semecarpus acuminatus is a species of plant in the family Anacardiaceae. It is native to Sri Lanka, Sri Lanka, Bangladesh and Myanmar. The specific epithet was originally spelt acuminata.

References

acuminatus
Flora of Bangladesh
Flora of Myanmar
Flora of Sri Lanka
Endangered plants
Taxonomy articles created by Polbot